The River Granta is the name of two of the four tributaries of the River Cam, although both names are often used synonymously. The Granta starts near the village of Widdington in Essex, flowing north past Audley End House to merge with the other contributary Rhee, which is also commonly called River Cam, a mile south of Grantchester.

A further tributary, also known as the Granta, runs  from south of Haverhill to join the larger Granta south of Great Shelford.

In many maps the river changes its name at the Silver Street Bridge in Cambridge and is called "Granta" above and "Cam" below it.

In earlier times even the lower part of the Cam was also named the Granta, but after the name of the Anglo-Saxon town of Grantebrycge had been modified to Cambridge, the river was renamed to match.

Grantchester and Granta Park are on the river banks of the river Granta and their names refer to the river itself.

Literature 
 Franz X. Bogner & Stephen P. Tomkins: The Cam. An Aerial Portrait of the Cambridge River. Laber Foundation, 2015.  (http://www.cambridgeriver.info/).

Links 
 geograph – River Granta at Shelford

Geography of Cambridge
Granta
Granta
Granta

ang:Granta